The Murusade or Murosade is a Somali subclan, part of the Karanle clan  of the Hawiye clan-family. The Murusade inhabit central and southern Somalia, specifically the Galgaduud, Lower Shabelle and Banadir regions. The clan also inhabits the national capital Mogadishu.

References 

Somali clans
Ethnic groups in Somalia